Medcities is a network of Mediterranean coastal cities created in Barcelona in 1991 at the initiative of the Mediterranean Technical Assistance Programmes (METAP). The METAP, whose objective is environmental improvement in the Mediterranean region, was established in 1990 by the World Bank, the European Investment Bank and the United Nations Development Programme.

The goals of the network are to strengthen the environmental management capability of local administration, through decentralised activities involving technical assistance, and also to reinforce awareness of interdependence and common responsibility regarding the policies of urban environmental conservation in the Mediterranean basin.

History
The creation of Medcities was a consequence of METAP's objective of strengthening decentralised actions involving technical assistance as the best means of promoting awareness of urban environmental problems and making those actions into a vehicle for empowering municipalities in developing countries in respect of management of urban environmental issues. Medcities continues offering this support. Afterwards, Medcities has extended its activities from the initial local environment to the wider local sustainable development field.

Objectives
The Medcities network is a tool to strengthen the environmental and sustainable development management capability of local administration, but it is also useful in order to identify the domains where a common activation could be the most useful means to improve the regional environmental conditions.
The goals of the Medcities Network are the following:
- to reinforce the awareness of interdependence and common responsibility regarding the policies of urban environmental conservation in the Mediterranean basin;

- to strengthen the role and the means (institutional, financial and technical capability) of municipalities in the implementation of local sustainable development policies;

- to develop awareness and involvement of citizens and consumers on urban sustainable development;

- to set up a direct cooperation policy in order to implement the partnership between coastal Mediterranean cities.

Members
The network originally comprised one city in each country, with a preference for cities other than the capital. Then an accord was subsequently reached expanding possible membership to two cities per country, and including Jordan.
Medcities includes today 27 cities from Mediterranean countries:

- Aleppo

- Alexandria

- Ancona

- Ashdod

- Barcelona

- Benghazi

- Dubrovnik

- El Mina

- Gaza

- Grand Lyon

- Izmir

- Larnaca

- Latakia

- Limassol

- Marseille

- Oran

- Rome

- Sfax

- Silifke

- Sousse

- Tangier

- Tetouan

- Thessaloniki

- Tirana

- Tripoli

- Zarqa

Organisation
General Assembly: it is the supreme body of the Association, and it is composed of all its members. It must be convened at least one every three years, and it gives a ruling on the items on the agenda proposed by the board, and on various others issues. It elects the President and the members of the Board.

Board: the Association is governed by a Board of 5 to 9 members: the President, the Secretary General and from three to seven members. It meets at least once a year.

Presidency: the President represents the Association in all acts of civil life, and he is invested with all the powers to this effect. The mandate of the President covers the period from one General Assembly to the other. The Presidency has been held by Barcelona, Marseille, Tangier, Limassol and Rome (at the present time).

General Secretariat: it is an administrative body which helps the Association's President and Board in their respective tasks. It is managed by a General Secretary and it takes care of the management of the network, identifying the needs of the cities, representing the Medcities network in international events (together with member cities), ensuring technical and financial coordination, the preparation and follow-up of field projects, the organisation of the General Assembly and the Board's meetings and the publishing of presentation material. The General Secretariat has a four-years mandate, and may be re-elected. Limassol, Marseilles and Barcelona (at the present time) have held the function of Secretary General.

Network activities

Institutional activities
Medcities is a tool that reinforces the environmental management capacity of local administrations. The network identifies areas where joint actions could contribute to improve regional environmental conditions. A key objective of Medcities is promoting sustainable urban development as a general policy in the Mediterranean. To this effect, it participates in the Nations Mediterranean Action Plan, and it is also a member of the Commission on Sustainable Development in the Local Government Area. Medcities is also a member of the steering committee for the European Sustainable Cities and Towns Campaign and of the Mediterranean Working Group of the Union of Cities and Local Governments.

Operational activities
The network's normal working procedure is based on environmental audits and medium-term environmental plans, followed by specific programmes to pursue the priorities that have been identified. Experts from Northern cities take part in developing these programmes, and those cities provide financing for one half of the cost of the work of those experts, with the remainder financed by METAP organisations (European Union, World Bank, UNDP) and the co-operation agencies of developed countries. Training is also provided through seminars, visits by technicians, training manuals and exhibitions. Medcities publishes an internal bulletin providing information on actions taken by the different cities and the network's own activities.

Areas of intervention
- Governance, institutional support, local finances;

- Urban planning and development;

- Environment and risk management (waste, air quality and mobility, water).

Projects realised
“Urban air quality improvement through air quality and mobility plan and the institutional strengthens of local administration on air quality”, with the participation of Barcelona, Larnaca, Limassol, Tetouan and Al Fayhaa.

“Urban mobility plan” in Sousse.

“Regional solid waste management” in Mashriq and Maghreb countries.

“Local Sustainable Development Networking" project.

“ICZM – Integrated Coastal Zone Management” project, co-financed by the EU SMAP programme.

References

External links
 Medcities official website
 Eurocities official website
 Integrated Coastal Zone Management
 Aalborg Commitments
 The SMAP air quality project in Mediterranean cities
 First Forum of Local Authorities EU-Morocco

Municipal international relations